LUNAR-A is a cancelled Japanese spacecraft project that was originally scheduled to be launched in August 2004.  After many delays (primarily due to potential thruster faults), the project was eventually cancelled in January 2007. It was planned to be launched on a Japanese M-V rocket from the Kagoshima Space Center.

History
The vehicle would have been cylindrical, with a diameter of 2.2 m and a height of 1.7 m. It would have had four solar panels and was engineered to be spin-stabilized. Plans called for it to enter an elliptical orbit around the Moon, and deploy two penetrators at an altitude of 40 km on opposite sides of the lunar body. The penetrators were to have been braked by a small rocket at an altitude of 25 km, then free fall to the surface. They were designed to withstand a collision speed of 330 meters per second to deeply penetrate the lunar regolith.

Once the penetrators deployed, the LUNAR-A spacecraft was mission-planned to maneuver to an orbital altitude of 200 km above the lunar surface. The craft was to have carried a monochromatic imaging camera with a resolution of 30 m.

See also
 Japan Aerospace Exploration Agency
 Moon
 Future lunar missions
 Exploration of the Moon

References

External links
 JAXA page
 ISAS page
 NASA Page about LUNAR-A
 LUNAR-A Mission Profile by NASA's Solar System Exploration

Missions to the Moon
Japanese space probes
Cancelled space probes
Japanese Lunar Exploration Program